René Henry Gracida (born June 9, 1923) is an American prelate of the Catholic Church who served as bishop of the Diocese of Corpus Christi in Texas from 1983 to 1997. He previously served as bishop of the Diocese of Pensacola-Tallahassee in Florida (1975–1983) and as an auxiliary bishop of the Archdiocese of Miami in Florida (1971–1975).

Early life
Born in New Orleans, Louisiana, on June 9, 1923, Gracida was the second child of Enrique J. Gracida Carrizosa, a Mexican architect and engineer, and Mathilde Derbes, a fifth-generation French-American Cajun. His great uncle was a vicar general of a diocese in Mexico. As a teenager, René Gracida was fascinated with the Jesuit martyrs portrayed in the novel The Last of the Mohicans by James Fenimore Cooper.

During World War II, Gracida flew 32 missions in the US Army Air Corps first as a tail-gunner, then as a flight engineer, in the 303rd Air Expeditionary Group. After the war, he entered the University of Houston, where he earned a Bachelor of Architecture degree. After graduation, Gracida worked as an architect for several years.

In 1951, Gracida entered the Order of St. Benedict and went into Saint Vincent Archabbey in Latrobe, Pennsylvania. This move upset his father, who disliked Catholic clergy. Required to choose a religious name, Gracida selected René Goupil, a French Jesuit lay missionary. Gracida took his simple vows in 1953 and his solemn vows in 1956. He was ordained a deacon in 1958. During this period, Gracida attended St. Vincent College and St. Vincent Seminary in Latrobe. At St. Vincent Seminary, he earned a Masters of Divinity degree.

Priesthood
Gracida was ordained into the priesthood for the Order of St. Benedict on May 23, 1959. In 1961, after a dispute over plans for a new residence for the Order, the archabbot told Gracida that he was no longer welcome in the order. That same year, Gracida was incardinated, or transferred, from the Benedictine Order to the Archdiocese of Miami.

Auxiliary Bishop of Miami 
On December 6, 1971, Gracida was appointed by Pope Paul VI as auxiliary bishop of the Archdiocese of Miami and titular bishop of Masuccaba. Gracida was consecrated on January 25, 1972 by Cardinal John Dearden, with Archbishop Coleman Carroll and Bishop Paul Tanner serving as co-consecrators.

Bishop of Pensacola-Tallahassee 
Pope Paul VI appointed Gracida as the first bishop of the new Diocese of Pensacola-Tallahassee on October 1, 1975; he was installed on November 6, 1975. In 1978, he was granted a Doctor of Laws (honoris causa) from St. Leo College in St. Leo, Florida.

Bishop of Corpus Christi 
On May 19, 1983 Pope John Paul II appointed Gracida as the bishop of the Diocese of Corpus Christi. He was installed on July 11, 1983.

Gracida and the Diocese of Corpus Christi were sued in 1988 by a couple who claimed that John J. Feminelli, a diocese priest, had engaged in private "wrestling matches" with their teenage son. The couple claimed that diocese officials slandered the boy, prompting him to recant his testimony in a court case. In 2019, Feminelli was listed with other priests in the diocese with credible allegations of sexual abuse of minors.

In January 1989, Gracida called for a boycott of all Pepsi-Cola products because of one of their commercial series. The commercials used the "Like a Prayer" music video by the singer Madonna that Gracida and other religious leaders considered sacrilegious. Pepsi eventually withdrew the ads and canceled its contract with Madonna.

In June 1990, Gracida excommunicated two parishioners in the diocese who were providing legal abortion services for women, citing canon law. They were Rachel Vargas, a women's health clinic director, and Dr. Eduardo Aquino, an obstetrician. In an interview, Aquino noted that he had recently won a $800,000 legal settlement against the anti-abortion group South Texas for Life, whose protestors had been picketing his house. Vargas ran her clinic for eight years and did not receive any notices from Gracida until she was interviewed on local television.

Retirement and later life 
When Gracida reached the mandatory retirement age of 75 for bishops, he submitted his letter of resignation to Pope John Paul II. The pope accepted Gracida's resignation on April 1, 1997.

On September 25, 2017, Gracida posted on his blog and publicly signed a "Filial Correction" of Pope Francis, being the first bishop to sign the document.

On June 13, 2018, the US Conference of Catholic Bishops approved a resolution condemning the immigration policies of the Trump Administration. Bishop Edward Weisenburger of the Diocese of Tucson suggested canonical penalties, which could include excommunication, for federal officials who separate children from families of undocumented immigrants. In a 2018 interview, Gracida rejected the idea of excommunicating these officials, saying, “It's scandalous for the bishop to say that! They did not write the law but are enforcing it [...] it's absurd and it's idiotic.”

Following Gracida's tenure as bishop of the Diocese of Corpus Christi, that diocese released a list of priests credibly accused of sexual abuse, much of which occurred while Gracida was bishop there.

Works
2016 – An Ordinary's Not So Ordinary Life

See also

Catholic Church hierarchy
Catholic Church in the United States
Historical list of the Catholic bishops of the United States
List of Catholic bishops of the United States
Lists of patriarchs, archbishops, and bishops

References

External links

"Abyssus Abyssum Invocat: Commentary on all things Catholic, Roman, that is!" (blog maintained by Bishop Gracida)
Roman Catholic Diocese of Corpus Christi
Roman Catholic Diocese of Pensacola–Tallahassee
Roman Catholic Archdiocese of Miami

1923 births
Living people
20th-century Roman Catholic bishops in the United States
Roman Catholic bishops of Pensacola–Tallahassee
Roman Catholic Ecclesiastical Province of Galveston–Houston
University of Houston alumni
Rice University alumni
American people of Mexican descent
American people of French descent
Cajun people
Saint Vincent Seminary alumni
United States Army Air Forces personnel of World War II
People from New Orleans
Roman Catholic Archdiocese of Miami
Religious leaders from Texas
Religious leaders from Florida
Catholics from Louisiana
United States Army Air Forces soldiers
American expatriates in Switzerland